{{Speciesbox
| image = FMIB 52830 Cerestoma nuttallii.jpeg
| taxon = Ceratostoma nuttalli| authority = Conrad, 1837
| synonyms_ref = 
| synonyms = 
 Murex nuttalli Conrad, 1837
 Murex unicornis Reeve, 1849
 Purpura albescens Dall, 1919
 Purpura albofasciata Dall, 1919
}}Ceratostoma nuttalli'' is a species of sea snail, a marine gastropod mollusk in the family Muricidae, the murex snails or rock snails.

References

Muricidae
Gastropods described in 1837